Full general elections were held in Belgium on 13 June 1848. They followed an equalisation of the tax qualifications for voters, which widened the franchise from 1.0% of the population to 1.8%.
Unlike the previous rules which had favoured Conservatives and Catholics (as the requirements were lower in the countryside), this benefitted the Liberal Party and damaged the Catholics, who lost more than half their seats.

Background
The existing electoral law differentiated in tax requirements between cities and countryside; cities (where Liberals were stronger) had to pay higher taxes in order to vote, compared to the countryside (where Catholics were stronger).

The Liberal Party held its founding congress two years earlier, on 13 June 1846, where it approved a proposal to lower the tax requirements in order to expand suffrage. By 1848, in the context of the Revolutions of 1848, reform was unavoidable. On the proposal of Liberal head of government Charles Rogier, the Parliament approved the law of 12 March 1848, which equalised and lowered the tax requirements to its constitutional minimum.

The new law benefited the Liberals, leading them to victory in these elections. The Liberals would retain their dominant position for the most part until 1884.

Campaign
One Chamber seat was uncontested, and won by the Liberal Party.

Results

Chamber of Representatives

The vote figures do not include the constituency of Oudenaarde.

Senate

References

Belgium
1840s elections in Belgium
General
Belgium